Poltava Raion is a raion (district) in Poltava Oblast of central Ukraine. The raion's administrative center is the city of Poltava. Population: 

On 18 July 2020, as part of the administrative reform of Ukraine, the number of raions of Poltava Oblast was reduced to four, and the area of Poltava Raion was significantly expanded.  The January 2020 estimate of the raion population was

References

Raions of Poltava Oblast
1923 establishments in Ukraine